Yun Woon-chul (born 1979) is a South Korean former footballer.

Telekom Malacca

Roped in by Malaysian team Telekom Malacca in December 2006 after registering 13 goals in 19 outings for Daejeon HSW, Woon-chul's main target was to help the club to the M-League title that season. However, the Korean striker ultimately failed, scoring his only goal in a 2-1 loss to Pahang i the 32nd minute. Eventually, in April 2007, Telekom Malacca cancelled his contract, saying that they wanted a more perspicacious player.

References

1979 births
Living people
South Korean footballers
Association football forwards
Expatriate footballers in Malaysia
South Korean expatriate footballers
Malaysia Super League players
Kyung Hee University alumni